Hardknox is an English electronic music duo consisting of producer and instrumentalist Steve Proctor and vocalist Lindy Layton. They have released two singles and a self-titled album. Their style of electronica features heavy beats with powerful vocal samples and unusual loops.

Their best-known tracks are "Psychopath", "Who's Money", and "Fire Like This". The latter was featured in the film Me, Myself and Irene and a Fiat Grande Punto TV advertisement in the UK. "Come In Hard (Don't Like Rock N' Roll)" was also featured in Microsoft rally game Rallisport Challenge, and the film 3000 Miles To Graceland. "Body Go" was featured in the film Rollerball.  "Attitude" was featured in an episode of the USA series La Femme Nikita and in the third episode of Misfits, and in the film My First Mister.

Samples on "Fire Like This"
This song features part of Big Walter Horton's harmonica solo, played originally on "Walking By Myself" by Jimmy Rogers.

Hardknox album

The band's self-titled debut album was released on 27 September 1999 on Jive Records. Rapper Schoolly D provides guest vocals on the album. "Fire Like This" was earlier released as 12" single by Skint Records in 1997.

Track listing
 "Coz I Can"
 "Fire Like This"
 "Come In Hard (Don't Like Rock N' Roll)"
 "Coming Back with a Sword"
 "Just Me 'N' You"
 "Attitude"
 "Who's Money"
 "Resistance Is Futile"
 "Psychopath"
 "Ain't Going Down"
 "Attitude (The Strongroom Mix)"

References

External links

English electronic music duos
Big beat groups